Michael Hồ Đình Hy (胡廷僖; 1808 – May 22, 1857) was a Vietnamese mandarin official who was martyred for his Roman Catholic belief during the persecutions by Emperor Tự Đức. He was canonized in 1988 along with another 116 Vietnamese Martyrs.

Life
Hồ Đình Hy was born to Christian parents in Cochinchina, and was by profession a wealthy silk trader. The youngest of the five remaining twelve children, he was married to a Christian from another family and had two sons and three daughters. Like other Christians at the time, they practiced their faith in private. At age 21, he obtained the fifth rank mandarin and appointed Superintendent of the royal silk mills afterwards. He was one of the few trusted officials who traveled abroad to conduct trades with other countries like Singapore and Malaysia. At the height of Christian persecution, when his eldest son requested to become a priest, he arranged to have him study in the Dutch East Indies (now Indonesia). After his remaining son died at the age of 12, Hồ Đình Hy declined to have his elder son returned home, according to Confucian traditions, citing he could not protect his own faith. During his years at the king's post, he performed many charitable acts to local unfortunates and helped to transport French and Portuguese missionaries on the waterways through his region under the guise of official business. His quick thinking helped the missionaries to travel through Vietnam discreetly and safely. The memoirs wrote that he personally traded his official robe as payment when the ship that transported the bishop of Society of Foreign Missions of Paris accidentally caused damages to a local merchant ship. He also offered clemency to robbers of the royal silk mill when they were captured  He was entrusted to guard missionaries' written records. These activities were illegal, as Christian missionary activity had been banned by the Nguyễn dynasty. He did not practice the faith publicly until late in life, becoming protector of the Christian community, which irked his fellow mandarins.

Arrest
Unlike other unnamed Vietnamese Martyrs whose lives and deeds were orally recorded, parts of Hồ Đình Hy's life could be found in memoirs of the Fathers of Foreign Missions in France. A local magistrate, discontented after Hồ Đình Hy had denied him access to the royal silk mill, petitioned to the king for his arrest based on his Christian activities.

During his imprisonment and torture, he played a gambit with the local magistrates by signing a confession that he was involved with the French government, who did not favor the Vietnamese courts persecuting Christians. The gambit did not work. The bishop of Society of Foreign Missions of Paris secretly requested that he recant his confession because it only resulted in more persecutions and France would not justified her presence in Vietnam based on religious persecutions.  He repented and signed a corrected confession, but it never made to the king's court. His last days were spent in repentance and humility.

Death
At the king's decree, Hồ Đình Hy was beheaded after suffering public humiliation, and all of his possessions were confiscated by the local magistrates. Some witnesses accounted that he refused his last meal and chose to die near his birthplace instead of at the execution site.  He also chose to wear his official robe instead of prisoner garb on his last day.  The memoirs of Fathers of Foreign Missions (Society of Foreign Missions of Paris) mentioned he received last rites discreetly by local priests and was survived by his wife and a married daughter. His remains were buried at the Basilica of Phú Cam and his birthplace. He was the last high-ranked official to be executed under the Nguyễn dynasty.

During his imprisonment and years after his death, Hồ Đình Hy was criticized for his written confession as means for further Christian persecution. Twenty-five years after his death, his eldest son, a retired priest, returned from the Dutch East Indies and justified his father's gambit. His written confession named him and his immediate family, along with non-existent people in the surrounding towns as Christians. As a result, his parents, in-laws and other relatives were spared from his fate. Other Christian towns and villages, while were raided, ended up with no further arrests.

Canonisation
He was petitioned to the Vatican for sainthood in 1867 by Louis Pallard of the Society of Foreign Missions of Paris. He was beatified in 1900 by Pope Leo XIII in the Fortissimorum Virorum Seriem. Pope John Paul II canonized him in 1988 along with other 116 Vietnamese Martyrs.

To commemorate his beatification in 1900, a historian, Nguyễn Hữu Bài (courtesy name Phước Môn), educated under the Vietnamese court, summarized his life as follows:

References

Catholics Online
The Persecutions of Annam: A History of Christianity in Cochin China and Tonking

External links 
Vietnamese Holy Martyrs Church - Arlington, VA
Church of the Vietnamese Martyrs - Richmond, VA
Vietnamese Martyrs Catholic Church - Houston, TX
Vietnamese Martyrs Catholic Parish - San Antonio, TX
Holy Vietnamese Martyrs Catholic Church - Austin, TX
 https://web.archive.org/web/20150924023259/http://www.gpnt.net/diendan/archive/index.php/t-466.html

 

 

1808 births
1857 deaths
Vietnamese Roman Catholic saints
19th-century Roman Catholic martyrs
19th-century Christian saints
19th-century executions by Vietnam
Executed Vietnamese people
Christian martyrs executed by decapitation
People executed by Vietnam by decapitation
Nguyen dynasty officials
Silk production